This is a list of diplomatic missions of the Sovereign Military Order of Malta. The Order of Malta is a sovereign entity of international law that does not have its own territory. It is a permanent non-state observer to the United Nations. It maintains diplomatic relations with over 100 countries. Some of these are hosts of Order of Malta Embassies. Additional non-diplomatic Order of Malta Associations and Relief organizations are not listed.

Europe

 Tirana (Embassy)

 Vienna (Embassy)
 
 Minsk (Embassy)
 
 Brussels (official delegation)

 Sarajevo (Embassy)

 Sofia (Embassy)

 Zagreb (Embassy)

 Nicosia (Embassy)

 Prague (Embassy)
 
 Brussels (official representation at Ambassador level)

 Paris (official representation)

 Tbilisi (Embassy)

 Berlin (Embassy)
	 
 (Embassy)

 Budapest (Embassy)

 Rome (Embassy)

 Riga (Embassy)
 
 Vilnius (Embassy)

 Luxembourg City (official delegation)

 Valletta (Embassy)

 Monaco (Embassy)

 Podgorica (Embassy)

 Skopje (Embassy) 

 Warsaw (Embassy)

 Lisbon (Embassy)

 Bucharest (Embassy)

 Moscow (diplomatic special mission)

 City of San Marino (Embassy)

 Belgrade (Embassy)

 Bratislava (Embassy)

 Ljubljana (Embassy)

 Madrid (Embassy)

 Solothurn (official delegation)
 
 Kyiv (Embassy)

SMOM also has diplomatic relations with Cyprus, but no mission is established there.

North America

 Nassau (Embassy)
 (official non-diplomatic relations)
 Ottawa (Canadian Association)

 San José (Embassy)

 Havana (Embassy)

 Santo Domingo (Embassy)

 San Salvador (Embassy)

 Guatemala City (Embassy)

 Santo Domingo (Embassy)

 Tegucigalpa (Embassy)

 Managua (Embassy)

 Panama City (Embassy)

 Kingstown (Embassy)

 Washington, D.C. (Liaison Office)

Sovereign Military Order of Malta also has diplomatic relations with Antigua and Barbuda and Grenada, but no missions established there.

South America

 Buenos Aires (Embassy)

 La Paz (Embassy)

 Brasília (Embassy)

 Santiago (Embassy)

 Bogotá (Embassy)

 Asunción (Embassy)

 Lima (Embassy)

 Paramaribo (Embassy)

 Montevideo (Embassy)

 Caracas (Embassy)

Sovereign Military Order of Malta also has diplomatic relations with Guyana, Belize and Grenada but no mission is established there.

Africa

 Luanda (Embassy)

 Cotonou (Embassy)

 Ouagadougou (Embassy)

 Yaoundé (Embassy)

 N'Djamena (Embassy)

 Bangui (Embassy)

 Moroni (Embassy)

 Kinshasa (Embassy)

 Cairo (Embassy)

 Addis Ababa (Embassy)

 Libreville (Embassy)

 Conakry (Embassy)

 Nairobi (Embassy)

 Monrovia (Embassy)

 Antananarivo (Embassy)

 Bamako (Embassy)

 Port Louis (Embassy)

 Rabat (Embassy)

 Maputo (Embassy)

 Windhoek (Embassy)

 Niamey (Embassy)

 São Tomé (Embassy)

 Dakar (Embassy)

 Victoria (Embassy)

 Khartoum (Embassy)

 Lomé (Embassy)

Sovereign Military Order of Malta also has diplomatic relations with Ivory Coast, Eritrea, Equatorial Guinea, Sierra Leone and Somalia, but no missions are established there.

Asia

 Dili (Embassy)

 Amman (Embassy)

 Astana (Embassy)

 Beirut (Embassy)

 Ramallah (Representation)

 Manila (Embassy)

 Bangkok (Embassy)

Sovereign Military Order of Malta also has diplomatic relations with Afghanistan, Tajikistan, and Turkmenistan, but no missions are established there.

Oceania

Sovereign Military Order of Malta also has diplomatic relations with Kiribati, Marshall Islands, the Federated States of Micronesia, and Nauru but no missions are established there.

Other entities
 International Committee of the Red Cross
 Geneva (delegation)

Multilateral organizations
 New York City (Permanent Mission to the United Nations)
 Permanent Observer Mission of the Sovereign Military Order of Malta to the United Nations, IAEA and CTBTO in Vienna 
 Geneva (Permanent Missions to the United Nations and other international organizations)
 Paris (Permanent Missions to the UNESCO and other international organizations)
 Rome (Permanent Missions to FAO and other international organizations)
 Nairobi (Permanent Mission to UNEP)
 Strasbourg (Delegation to the Council of Europe)
 Washington, D.C. (Delegation to the Organization of American States and other international organizations)
 Brussels (Delegation to the International Committee of Military Medicine)

See also

Accreditations and diplomatic relations of the Sovereign Military Order of Malta
List of diplomatic missions to the Sovereign Military Order of Malta
Foreign relations of the Sovereign Military Order of Malta
Robert L. Shafer

Notes

References

External links
List of delegations of Sovereign Military Order of Malta to international organizations
List of diplomatic missions of Sovereign Military Order of Malta to countries - Around the World

Sovereign Military Order of Malta
Order of Malta